Newcomb Carlton (1869–1953)  was an American telecommunications executive. He served as president of Western Union and in 1918, when the telegraph industry was placed under government control, as director of all cable lines in the United States.

In 1933, he became chairman of the company.

He travelled extensively as part of his job.

In 1926 he was injured when he was hit by a taxi.

References

1869 births
1953 deaths
American chief executives
American technology chief executives
Western Union